The 2022 Mexicas de la Ciudad de México season was the Mexicas de la Ciudad de México seventh season in the Liga de Fútbol Americano Profesional (LFA) and their third under head coach Héctor Toxqui. After the 2021 season was cancelled due to the COVID-19 pandemic, the Mexicas returned to play in 2022.

Mexicas finished the regular season as the third ranked team with a 4–2 record. The Mexicas were defeated by the Gallos Negros on the Wild Card round 7–14.

Draft

Roster

Regular season

Standings

Schedule

Postseason

Schedule

Awards
The following Mexicas players were awarded at the 2022 LFA Gala.

Notes

References

2022 in American football
Mexicas